Grimwith Reservoir is located in the Yorkshire Dales in North Yorkshire, England. It was originally built by the Bradford Corporation as one of eleven reservoirs in the Yorkshire Dales to supply fresh water to Bradford. It is the largest reservoir owned by Yorkshire Water in terms of water storage. It is near the villages of Appletreewick, Burnsall, Hartlington, Hebden, and Skyreholme.

History 

This involved the abandonment of the hamlets of Grimwith and Gate Up, which would be flooded as part of the reservoir. The reservoir outlet is the site of a renewable energy project that saw the installation of a small turbine that generates 1400 MWh of electricity per annum.

The reservoir is an important area for birds and is home to wildfowl such as Eurasian wigeon, teal, greylag geese and Canada geese. Other birds that can be seen at various times in the area include ringed plover, northern lapwing, common redshank, Eurasian curlew, reed bunting, lesser redpoll, whinchat and sedge warbler.

The reservoir is a popular destination for leisure activities such as sailing, walking and visitors to Stump Cross Caverns. A  wheelchair-accessible footpath / track circumnavigates the reservoir. The Yorkshire Dales Sailing Club have their facilities on the south side of the reservoir, and regularly hold meets and sailing championships. In 2019, the club announced that it had been awarded Recognised Training Centre status by the Royal Yachting Association.

At the eastern end of the reservoir is a grade II listed barn. The Cruck Barn used to be further west, but was reconstructed on its present site above the waterline to preserve it. This type of barn is rare for the Yorkshire Dales. Its origins were in the 16th century and was rebuilt in 1982 when the reservoir was extended.

Gallery

References

External links 
 Yorkshire Water – Grimwith Reservoir
 Walking route
 Yorkshire Dales Sailing Club

Reservoirs in North Yorkshire